The town Giazza (Ljetzan in cimbrian language, Jassa // in Western Venetian) is a frazione of the comune of Selva di Progno, in the Province of Verona.

Geography 

The town is located at the confluence of the Revolto and Fraselle rivers, and just below the mountain Gruppo della Carega.

Language and dialects 
Giazza is the last of the ancient Thirteen Communities in which Cimbrian language is still spoken.

Today the Cimbrian language is falling out of use. According to the most recent data only 19 inhabitants speak the language and only 24 can understand it.

Culture

Events 
 Festa del fuoco (trans. The Festival of Fire) (23 June) – A festival of pagan origins in which the community celebrates its history as part of the 13 communities.

References 

Cities and towns in Veneto